This is a list of members of the Victorian Legislative Council from 2002 to 2006, as elected at the 2002 state election:

 Silvan Province MLC Carolyn Hirsh was forced to resign from the Labor Party in September 2004 after being caught driving without a licence, which she had lost after being booked for drink-driving earlier in the year. She was later readmitted in November 2005, after a failed attempt to rejoin in April, but was subsequently expelled again in June 2006 after another drink-driving incident.
 Ballarat Province MLC Dianne Hadden resigned from the Labor Party on 7 April 2005 and announced her intention to serve out the remainder of her term as an independent.
 Silvan Province MLC Andrew Olexander was dismissed from the parliamentary wing of the Liberal Party on 29 November 2005, due to critical comments made after the decision not to grant him party endorsement to contest the next election after a drink-driving scandal.

Members of the Parliament of Victoria by term
21st-century Australian politicians